Pinckney may refer to:

Places in the United States
 Pinckney, Michigan
 Pinckney, Missouri
 Pinckney, New York
 Pinckney State Recreation Area, a protected area in Michigan

Ships
 USS Pinckney, a US Navy destroyer

People
Pinckney (surname)

Given name
Pinckney Benedict (born 1964), American short-story writer
Pinckney Downie Bowles (1835–1910), American Confederate general
Pinckney R. Tully (1824–1903), American businessman and politician
Pinckney Wilkinson (c. 1693–1784), British merchant and politician
Green Pinckney Russell (1861/63–1939), American school administrator and teacher

See also
 Castle Pinckney, a US fortification in South Carolina
 The Community Learning Center at Pinckney, an alternative Middle and High School in Carthage, North Carolina
 Pinckney's Treaty (1795–1796), between Spain and the US
 
 Pinkney (disambiguation)